Antonio Price "Tra" Holder or Antonio Price Soonthornchote (born September 27, 1995) is an American-Thai professional basketball player who last played for the Capitanes de Ciudad de México of the NBA G League. He played college basketball for the Arizona State Sun Devils.

Early life
Holder was born to Charee Rogers and Tony Holder. His mother is Thai. Holder grew up in Los Angeles, and attended high school at Brentwood School.

College career
Holder committed to Arizona State, and former coach Herb Sendek after an unofficial visit to campus in May 2013. In his first season, he was honored as a member of the Pac-12 All-Freshman Team. As a sophomore, he developed into one of the best guards in the conference under Bobby Hurley. As a junior, Holder averaged 16.2 points, 3.7 rebounds and 3.2 assists per game.

Holder was named Pac-12 Player of the Week on November 20, 2017, after averaging 23.7 points, 6.3 rebounds, 5.7 assists and 2.0 steals in three victories. Holder scored 40 points to lead the Sun Devils to a 102–86 win over No. 15 Xavier. He was again awarded player of the week honors on November 27. Holder had 29 points  on 8-for-16 shooting in a 95–85 victory over second-ranked Kansas on December 9. He would lead the Sun Devils to their first ever 10–0 start in college basketball history after a 76–64 win over the Vanderbilt Commodores. 
Ranked #3 in the AP poll and as the last undefeated team in the nation (12–0), on December 30, the Sun Devils played on the road at their historic rival, the Arizona Wildcats in McKale Arena. Tra Holder was the leading scorer of the game with 31 points, but the Sun Devils fell to the Wildcats 78–84 to begin the Pac-12 Conference schedule.

Professional career

Auxilium Torino (2018)
After going undrafted in the 2018 NBA Draft, on July 14, 2018, Holder signed a deal with the Italian club Auxilium Torino for the 2018–19 LBA season.

MKS Dąbrowa Górnicza (2020–2021)
On January 15, 2020, Holder signed with MKS Dąbrowa Górnicza of the Polish Basketball League (PLK).

Nürnberg Falcons (2021)
In January 2021, Holder signed with Nürnberg Falcons BC of the German ProA.

Birmingham Squadron (2021–2022)
On October 25, Holder signed with the Birmingham Squadron after being acquired from the available player pool. He was then later waived on January 31, 2022. On February 16, 2022, Holder was reacquired and activated by the Birmingham Squadron. On March 2, 2022, Holder was waived by the Birmingham Squadron.

Westchester Knicks (2022)
On March 5, 2022, Holder was acquired via available player pool by the Westchester Knicks. On December 14, 2022, Holder was waived.

Capitanes de Ciudad de México (2023)
On February 13, 2023, Holder was acquired by the Capitanes de Ciudad de México. On February 28, 2023, Holder was waived.

National team career
Holder has played for the Thai national team.

References

External links
Arizona State Sun Devils bio

1995 births
Living people
American expatriate basketball people in Germany
American expatriate basketball people in Italy
American expatriate basketball people in Mexico
American men's basketball players
American sportspeople of Thai descent
Arizona State Sun Devils men's basketball players
Auxilium Pallacanestro Torino players
Basketball players from Los Angeles
Birmingham Squadron players
Capitanes de Ciudad de México players
Competitors at the 2021 Southeast Asian Games
Lega Basket Serie A players
Nürnberg Falcons BC players
Point guards
Skyliners Frankfurt players
Tra Holder
Tra Holder
Southeast Asian Games medalists in 3x3 basketball
Southeast Asian Games medalists in basketball
Tra Holder
Westchester Knicks players